The Sorbe is a right-bank tributary of the Henares, located in the centre of the Iberian Peninsula. It forms part of the Tagus river basin.

It has a length of 79.5 km. Running southwards through the Spanish province of Guadalajara, it empties in the Henares at 700 m above sea level, near Humanes.  

It drains a basin of 546 km.2.

References 
Citations

Bibliography
 
 

Rivers of Castilla–La Mancha
Geography of the Province of Guadalajara
Tributaries of the Henares